John Edward Ferris (July 24, 1949 – September 13, 2020) was an American competition swimmer, Olympic medalist, and one time world record-holder.

Ferris won two bronze medals at the 1968 Summer Olympics in Mexico City; one in the men's 200-meter individual medley and one in the men's 200-meter butterfly.  His third-place finish in the 200-meter individual medley completed an American sweep of the event, with Charlie Hickcox taking first and Greg Buckingham taking second.

Ferris attended Stanford University, where he swam for the Stanford Cardinal swimming and diving team in National Collegiate Athletic Association (NCAA) competition.  He received a gold medal in the 200-meter butterfly at the 1967 World University Games, where he set a new world-record time of 2:06.0.  He also won an NCAA national championship in the 200-yard butterfly in 1969.

Ferris died from lung cancer on September 13, 2020.

See also
 List of Olympic medalists in swimming (men)
 List of Stanford University people
 World record progression 200 metres butterfly

References

External links
 

1949 births
2020 deaths
American male butterfly swimmers
American male medley swimmers
World record setters in swimming
Olympic bronze medalists for the United States in swimming
Sportspeople from Sacramento, California
Swimmers from California
Stanford Cardinal men's swimmers
Swimmers at the 1968 Summer Olympics
Medalists at the 1968 Summer Olympics
Universiade medalists in swimming
Universiade gold medalists for the United States
Universiade silver medalists for the United States
Medalists at the 1967 Summer Universiade
Medalists at the 1970 Summer Universiade
Deaths from lung cancer in California
20th-century American people